Diyabubula (Water Fountain) is a small luxury lodge, a boutique hotel consisting of five villas, located near the town of Dambulla and east of A9 highway in the Matale District, Central Province, Sri Lanka. It is an oasis of peace and quiet - for nature lovers, cultural interested tourits or anyone who wants to enjoy the magic of this place in the middle of beautiful art. Renowned Sri Lankan artist Laki Senanayake designed the place as a hideaway to compliment his water garden.

References 

Populated places in Central Province, Sri Lanka